Mohabbatein is a 2000 Indian Hindi-language romantic drama film written and directed by Aditya Chopra. It stars an ensemble cast of Amitabh Bachchan, Shah Rukh Khan, Aishwarya Rai, and the newcomers Uday Chopra, Shamita Shetty, Jugal Hansraj, Kim Sharma, Jimmy Sheirgill, and Preeti Jhangiani. It tells the story of the all-boys college Gurukul's principal Narayan Shankar (Bachchan) who prohibits his students from falling in love and will unhesitantly expel those who do not obey the rule. The rest of the film focuses on how the arrival of the violin teacher Raj Aryan Malhotra (Khan) changes his views. Mohabbatein soundtrack was composed by Jatin–Lalit, and the lyrics were written by Anand Bakshi. The film was shot by Manmohan Singh on sets designed by Sharmishta Roy, while the editor was V. Karnik.

The film opened at theatres on 27 October 2000 and was met with widespread acclaim from critics, who praised the performances of Bachchan and Khan.

Mohabbatein won 18 awards out of 48 nominations; the cast's performances, the story, and the screenplay garnered the most attention from various award groups. At the 46th Filmfare Awards, it was nominated in nine categories including Best Film, Best Director (Aditya Chopra), Best Actor (Khan), Best Supporting Actress (Rai), and Best Music Director (Jatin–Lalit). It went on to win three awards including those for Best Actor – Critics (Khan) and Best Supporting Actor (Bachchan). In the second iteration of the International Indian Film Academy Awards, the film received nine nominations including Best Film, Best Director for Aditya Chopra, and Best Actor for Khan, and won four including Best Supporting Actor for Bachchan. Among other wins, it also received three Bollywood Movie Awards, one Screen Award, and two Zee Cine Awards.

Awards and nominations

Notes

References

Sources

External links 

 Awards and nominations received by Mohabbatein at IMDb

Mohabbatein